Ljusnan (from Old Norse: Lusn — light) is a river in Sweden, which is 440 kilometers long. The river starts in northwestern Härjedalen and then continues throughout the province into Hälsingland all the way to the Bothnian Sea. The biggest tributary is Voxnan. The river is heavily used for hydropower with 18 hydro powerplants. 
During 2001 Ljusnan produced 4,5 TWh.

References

Rivers of Jämtland County
Härjedalen
Hälsingland
Drainage basins of the Baltic Sea